The following is a list of Kyiv Metro stations in Kyiv, the capital of Ukraine. The system is in service from 1960 and now has 52 stations.

Sviatoshynsko-Brovarska Line 

 Akademmistechko
 Zhytomyrska
 Sviatoshyn
 Nyvky
 Beresteiska
 Shuliavska
 Politekhnichnyi Instytut
 Vokzalna
 Universytet
 Teatralna → Zoloti Vorota 
 Khreshchatyk → Maidan Nezalezhnosti 
 Arsenalna
 Dnipro
 Hidropark
 Livoberezhna
 Darnytsia
 Chernihivska
 Lisova

Obolonsko–Teremkivska Line 

 Heroiv Dnipra
 Minska
 Obolon
 Pochaina
 Tarasa Shevchenka
 Kontraktova Ploshcha
 Poshtova Ploshcha
 Maidan Nezalezhnosti → Khreshchatyk 
 Ploshcha Lva Tolstoho → Palats Sportu 
 Olimpiiska
 Palats Ukraina
 Lybidska
 Demiivska
 Holosiivska
 Vasylkivska
 Vystavkovyi Tsentr
 Ipodrom
 Teremky

Syretsko-Pecherska Line 

 Syrets
 Dorohozhychi
 Lukianivska
 Lvivska Brama 
 Zoloti Vorota → Teatralna 
 Palats Sportu → Ploshcha Lva Tolstoho 
 Klovska
 Pecherska
 Druzhby Narodiv
 Vydubychi
 Telychka 
 Slavutych
 Osokorky
 Pozniaky
 Kharkivska
 Vyrlytsia
 Boryspilska
 Chervonyi Khutir

Kiev Metro stations
Metro stations
Kiev